Dane Schadendorf (born 31 July 2002) is a Zimbabwean cricketer. He made his first-class debut on 4 July 2021, for Nottinghamshire in the 2021 County Championship. Prior to his first-class debut, Schadendorf was named in Zimbabwe's squad for the 2020 Under-19 Cricket World Cup. He signed for Nottinghamshire in December 2020 on professional terms. He had played club cricket for Caythorpe as well as for Nottinghamshire's Under-18s and second XI in the 2020 season. He made his List A debut on 25 July 2021, for Nottinghamshire  in the 2021 Royal London One-Day Cup.

References

External links
 

2002 births
Living people
Zimbabwean cricketers
Nottinghamshire cricketers
Sportspeople from Harare